India competed at the 1972 Summer Olympics in Munich, West Germany. 41 competitors, 40 men and 1 woman, took part in 27 events in 7 sports.

Competitors

Medalists

Bronze
 Charles Cornelius, Manuel Frederick, Ashok Kumar, Michael Kindo, Ganesh Mullera Poovayya, Krishnamurty Perumal, Victor Philips, Harcharan singh, B. P. Govinda, Vece Paes, Ajitpal Singh, Harbinder Singh, Harmik Singh, Kulwant Singh, Mukhbain Singh, and Virinder Singh — Field hockey, Men's Team Competition.

Athletics

Men's 800 metres
Sriram Singh
 Heat — 1:47.7 (→ did not advance)
Rajinder Kohli
Heat —1:48.1 (→did not advance)

Men's 5000 metres
Edward Sequeira
 Heat — 14:01.4 (→ did not advance)
Men's Long jump
Mohinder Gill Singh
 Qualification Round — 7.30(→ 30th place)
Men's High Jump
Suresh Babu
 Qualification Round — 1.90m (→ did not advance)
Men's Shot put
Jugraj Singh
 Qualification Round — 17.15(→ 26th place)
Men's Discus throw
Praveen Kumar Sobti
 Qualification Round — 53.12(→ 26th place)

Boxing

Men's Flyweight (– 51 kg)
 Chander Narayanan
 First Round — Bye
 Second Round — Lost to Leszek Błażyński (POL), 2:3

Hockey

Sailing

Shooting

Four male shooters represented India in 1972.

50 m rifle, prone
 Parimal Chatterjee
 Qualification Round — 572(→ 95th place)

 Roy Choudhury
 Qualification Round — 567(→ 99th place)

Trap
 Karni Singh
 Qualification Round — 180(→ 34th place)

Trap
 Randhir Singh
 Qualification Round — 173(→ 44th place)

Skeet
 Karni Singh
 Qualification Round — 186(→ 36th place)

Weightlifting

Men

Wrestling

References

External links
databaseOlympics.com
International Olympic Committee

Nations at the 1972 Summer Olympics
1972 Summer Olympics